Lilith 3.2 is the third EP by Battery, released on August 2, 1994 by COP International.

Reception
Industrial Reviews gave Lilith 3.2 three stars out of five and praised the cheery nostalgia of "Pax Neurotica" and bleak atmosphere of "Lilith". Sonic Boom said "If you are looking for a band with unbelievable strong female vocals and who are not afraid to develop a music style all of their own that have a listen to Battery and I am sure that you will not be disappointed."

Track listing

Personnel
Adapted from the Lilith 3.2 liner notes.

Battery
 Maria Azevedo – production, lead vocals (3), backing vocals (2)
 Shawn Brice – instruments, production, backing vocals (2)
 Evan Sornstein (Curium Design) – instruments, production, lead vocals (2), cover art, illustrations, design

Production and design
 Christian Petke (as Count Zero) – production

Release history

References

External links 
 Lilith 3.2 at Discogs (list of releases)
 Lilith at iTunes

1994 EPs
Battery (electro-industrial band) albums
COP International EPs